Stoicism is a school of Hellenistic philosophy founded by Zeno of Citium in Athens in the early 3rd century BCE. It is a philosophy of personal virtue ethics informed by its system of logic and its views on the natural world, asserting that the practice of virtue is both necessary and sufficient to achieve  (happiness): one flourishes by living an ethical life.

Alongside Aristotelian ethics, the Stoic tradition forms one of the major founding approaches to virtue ethics. The Stoics are especially known for teaching that "virtue is the only good" for human beings, and that external things, such as health, wealth, and pleasure, are not good or bad in themselves (adiaphora) but have value as "material for virtue to act upon". Many Stoics—such as Seneca and Epictetus—emphasized that because "virtue is sufficient for happiness", a sage would be emotionally resilient to misfortune. The Stoics also held that certain destructive emotions resulted from errors of judgment, and they believed people should aim to maintain a will (called prohairesis) that is "in accordance with nature". Because of this, the Stoics thought the best indication of an individual's philosophy was not what a person said but how a person behaved. To live a good life, one had to understand the rules of the natural order since they believed everything was rooted in nature.

Stoicism flourished throughout the Roman and Greek world until the 3rd century CE, and among its adherents was Emperor Marcus Aurelius. It experienced a decline after Christianity became the state religion in the 4th century CE. Since then, it has seen revivals, notably in the Renaissance (Neostoicism) and in the contemporary era (modern Stoicism).

History
The name Stoicism derives from the Stoa Poikile (Ancient Greek: ἡ ποικίλη στοά), or "painted porch", a colonnade decorated with mythic and historical battle scenes on the north side of the Agora in Athens where Zeno of Citium and his followers gathered to discuss their ideas, near the end of the 4th century BCE. Unlike the Epicureans, Zeno chose to teach his philosophy in a public space. Stoicism was originally known as Zenonism. However, this name was soon dropped, likely because the Stoics did not consider their founders to be perfectly wise and to avoid the risk of the philosophy becoming a cult of personality.

Zeno's ideas developed from those of the Cynics, whose founding father, Antisthenes, had been a disciple of Socrates. Zeno's most influential follower was Chrysippus, who followed his as leader of the school after Cleanthes, and was responsible for molding what is now called Stoicism. Stoicism became the foremost popular philosophy among the educated elite in the Hellenistic world and the Roman Empire to the point where, in the words of Gilbert Murray, "nearly all the successors of Alexander [...] professed themselves Stoics". Later Roman Stoics focused on promoting a life in harmony within the universe over which one has no direct control. 

Scholars usually divide the history of Stoicism into three phases: the Early Stoa, from Zeno's founding to Antipater,the  Middle Stoa, including Panaetius and Posidonius, and the Late Stoa, including Musonius Rufus, Seneca, Epictetus, and Marcus Aurelius. No complete works survived from the first two phases of Stoicism. Only Roman texts from the Late Stoa survived.

Philosophical system

The Stoics provided a unified account of the world, constructed from ideals of logic, monistic physics, and naturalistic ethics. Of these, they emphasized ethics as the main focus of human knowledge, though their logical theories were of more interest for later philosophers.

Stoicism teaches the development of self-control and fortitude as a means of overcoming destructive emotions; the philosophy holds that becoming a clear and unbiased thinker allows one to understand the universal reason (logos). Stoicism's primary aspect involves improving the individual's ethical and moral well-being: "Virtue consists in a will that is in agreement with Nature". This principle also applies to the realm of interpersonal relationships; "to be free from anger, envy, and jealousy", and to accept even slaves as "equals of other men, because all men alike are products of nature".

The Stoic ethic espouses a deterministic perspective; in regard to those who lack Stoic virtue, Cleanthes once opined that the wicked man is "like a dog tied to a cart, and compelled to go wherever it goes". A Stoic of virtue, by contrast, would amend his will to suit the world and remain, in the words of Epictetus, "sick and yet happy, in peril and yet happy, dying and yet happy, in exile and happy, in disgrace and happy", thus positing a "completely autonomous" individual will and at the same time a universe that is "a rigidly deterministic single whole". This viewpoint was later described as "Classical Pantheism" (and was adopted by Dutch philosopher Baruch Spinoza).

Logic

Diodorus Cronus, who was one of Zeno's teachers, is considered the philosopher who first introduced and developed an approach to logic now known as propositional logic, which is based on statements or propositions, rather than terms, differing greatly from Aristotle's term logic. Later, Chrysippus developed a system that became known as Stoic logic and included a deductive system, Stoic Syllogistic, which was considered a rival to Aristotle's Syllogistic (see Syllogism). New interest in Stoic logic came in the 20th century, when important developments in logic were based on propositional logic. Susanne Bobzien wrote, "The many close similarities between Chrysippus's philosophical logic and that of Gottlob Frege are especially striking".

Bobzien also notes that, "Chrysippus wrote over 300 books on logic, on virtually any topic logic today concerns itself with, including speech act theory, sentence analysis, singular and plural expressions, types of predicates, indexicals, existential propositions, sentential connectives, negations, disjunctions, conditionals, logical consequence, valid argument forms, theory of deduction, propositional logic, modal logic, tense logic, epistemic logic, logic of suppositions, logic of imperatives, ambiguity and logical paradoxes".

Categories
The Stoics held that all beings (ὄντα)—though not all things (τινά)—are material. Besides the existing beings they admitted four incorporeals  (asomata): time, place, void, and sayable. They were held to be just 'subsisting' while such a status was denied to universals. Thus, they accepted Anaxagoras's idea (as did Aristotle) that if an object is hot, it is because some part of a universal heat body had entered the object. But, unlike Aristotle, they extended the idea to cover all accidents. Thus, if an object is red, it would be because some part of a universal red body had entered the object.

They held that there were four categories.
 Substance (ὑποκείμενον): The primary matter, formless substance, (ousia) that things are made of
 Quality (ποιόν): The way matter is organized to form an individual object; in Stoic physics, a physical ingredient (pneuma: air or breath), which informs the matter
 Somehow disposed (πως ἔχον): Particular characteristics, not present within the object, such as size, shape, action, and posture
 Somehow disposed in relation to something (πρός τί πως ἔχον): Characteristics related to other phenomena, such as the position of an object within time and space relative to other objects

Stoics outlined what we have control over categories of our own action, thoughts and reaction. The opening paragraph of the Enchiridion states the categories as: "Things in our control are opinion, pursuit, desire, aversion, and, in a word, whatever are our own actions. Things not in our control are body, property, reputation, command, and, in a word, whatever are not our own actions." These suggest a space that is within our own control. A simple example of the Stoic categories in use is provided by Jacques Brunschwig:
I am a certain lump of matter, and thereby a substance, an existent something (and thus far that is all); I am a man, and this individual man that I am, and thereby qualified by a common quality and a peculiar one; I am sitting or standing, disposed in a certain way; I am the father of my children, the fellow citizen of my fellow citizens, disposed in a certain way in relation to something else.

Epistemology
The Stoics propounded that knowledge can be attained through the use of reason. Truth can be distinguished from fallacy—even if, in practice, only an approximation can be made. According to the Stoics, the senses constantly receive sensations: pulsations that pass from objects through the senses to the mind, where they leave an impression in the imagination (phantasiai) (an impression arising from the mind was called a phantasma).

The mind has the ability to judge (συγκατάθεσις, synkatathesis)—approve or reject—an impression, enabling it to distinguish a true representation of reality from one that is false. Some impressions can be assented to immediately, but others can achieve only varying degrees of hesitant approval, which can be labeled belief or opinion (doxa). It is only through reason that we gain clear comprehension and conviction (katalepsis). Certain and true knowledge (episteme), achievable by the Stoic sage, can be attained only by verifying the conviction with the expertise of one's peers and the collective judgment of humankind.

Physics

According to the Stoics, the Universe is a material reasoning substance (logos), which was divided into two classes: the active and the passive. The passive substance is matter, which "lies sluggish, a substance ready for any use, but sure to remain unemployed if no one sets it in motion". The active substance is an intelligent aether or primordial fire, which acts on the passive matter:

Everything is subject to the laws of Fate, for the Universe acts according to its own nature, and the nature of the passive matter it governs. The souls of humans and animals are emanations from this primordial Fire, and are, likewise, subject to Fate:

Individual souls are perishable by nature, and can be "transmuted and diffused, assuming a fiery nature by being received into the seminal reason ("logos spermatikos") of the Universe". Since right Reason is the foundation of both humanity and the universe.

Stoic theology is a fatalistic and naturalistic pantheism: God is never fully transcendent but always immanent, and identified with Nature. Abrahamic religions personalize God as a world-creating entity, but Stoicism equates God with the totality of the universe; according to Stoic cosmology, which is very similar to the Hindu conception of existence, there is no absolute start to time, as it is considered infinite and cyclic. Similarly, space and the Universe have neither start nor end, rather they are cyclical. The current Universe is a phase in the present cycle, preceded by an infinite number of Universes, doomed to be destroyed ("ekpyrōsis", conflagration) and re-created again, and to be followed by another infinite number of Universes. Stoicism considers all existence as cyclical, the cosmos as eternally self-creating and self-destroying (see also Eternal return).

Stoicism does not posit a beginning or end to the Universe. According to the Stoics, the logos was the active reason or anima mundi pervading and animating the entire Universe. It was conceived as material and is usually identified with God or Nature. The Stoics also referred to the seminal reason ("logos spermatikos"), or the law of generation in the Universe, which was the principle of the active reason working in inanimate matter. Humans, too, each possess a portion of the divine logos, which is the primordial Fire and reason that controls and sustains the Universe.

Ethics
The foundation of Stoic ethics is that good lies in the state of the soul itself; in wisdom and self-control. One must therefore strive to be free of the passions. For the Stoics, reason meant using logic and understanding the processes of nature—the logos or universal reason, inherent in all things. The Greek word pathos was a wide-ranging term indicating an infliction one suffers. The Stoics used the word to discuss many common emotions such as anger, fear and excessive joy. A passion is a disturbing and misleading force in the mind which occurs because of a failure to reason correctly. 

For the Stoic Chrysippus, the passions are evaluative judgements. A person experiencing such an emotion has incorrectly valued an indifferent thing. A fault of judgement, some false notion of good or evil, lies at the root of each passion. Incorrect judgement as to a present good gives rise to delight, while lust is a wrong estimate about the future. Unreal imaginings of evil cause distress about the present, or fear for the future. The ideal Stoic would instead measure things at their real value, and see that the passions are not natural. To be free of the passions is to have a happiness which is self-contained. There would be nothing to fear—for unreason is the only evil; no cause for anger—for others cannot harm you.

Passions
The Stoics arranged the passions under four headings: distress, pleasure, fear and lust. One report of the Stoic definitions of these passions appears in the treatise On Passions by Pseudo-Andronicus (trans. Long & Sedley, pg. 411, modified):
Distress (lupē): Distress is an irrational contraction, or a fresh opinion that something bad is present, at which people think it right to be depressed.
Fear (phobos): Fear is an irrational aversion, or avoidance of an expected danger.
Lust (epithumia): Lust is an irrational desire, or pursuit of an expected good but in reality bad.
Delight (hēdonē): Delight is an irrational swelling, or a fresh opinion that something good is present, at which people think it right to be elated.

Two of these passions (distress and delight) refer to emotions currently present, and two of these (fear and lust) refer to emotions directed at the future. Thus there are just two states directed at the prospect of good and evil, but subdivided as to whether they are present or future: Numerous subdivisions of the same class were brought under the head of the separate passions: 
Distress: Envy, Rivalry, Jealousy, Compassion, Anxiety, Mourning, Sadness, Troubling, Grief, Lamenting, Depression, Vexation, Despondency. 
Fear: Sluggishness,  Shame, Fright, Timidity, Consternation, Pusillanimity, Bewilderment, and Faintheartedness. 
Lust: Anger, Rage, Hatred, Enmity, Wrath, Greed, and Longing. 
Delight: Malice, Rapture, and Ostentation.

The wise person (sophos) is someone who is free from the passions (apatheia). Instead the sage experiences good-feelings (eupatheia) which are clear-headed. These emotional impulses are not excessive, but nor are they diminished emotions. Instead they are the correct rational emotions. The Stoics listed the good-feelings under the headings of joy (chara), wish (boulesis), and caution (eulabeia). Thus if something is present which is a genuine good, then the wise person experiences an uplift in the soul—joy (chara). The Stoics also subdivided the good-feelings:

Joy: Enjoyment, Cheerfulness Good spirits
Wish: Good intent, Goodwill, Welcoming, Cherishing, Love
Caution: Moral shame, Reverence

Suicide
The Stoics accepted that suicide was permissible for the wise person in circumstances that might prevent them from living a virtuous life, such as if they fell victim to severe pain or disease, but otherwise suicide would usually be seen as a rejection of one's social duty. For example, Plutarch reports that accepting life under tyranny would have compromised Cato's self-consistency (constantia) as a Stoic and impaired his freedom to make the honorable moral choices.

Love and sexuality
Early Stoics differed significantly from late Stoics in their views of sexuality, romantic love and sexual relationships. Zeno first advocated for a republic ruled by love and not by law, where marriage would be abolished, wives would be held in common, and eroticism would be practiced with both boys and girls with educative purposes, to develop virtue in the loved ones. However, he didn't condemn marriage per se, considering it equally a natural occurrence. He regarded same sex relationships positively, and maintained that wise men should "have carnal knowledge no less and no more of a favorite than of a non-favorite, nor of a female than of a male." 

Zeno favored love over desire, clarifying that the ultimate goal of sexuality should be virtue and friendship. Among later stoics, Epictetus maintained homosexual and heterosexual sex as equivalent in this field, and condemned only the kind of desire that led one to act against judgement. However, contemporaneous positions generally advanced towards equating sexuality with passion, and although they were still not hostile to sexual relationships by themselves, they nonetheless believed those should be limited in order to retain self-control. Musonius espoused the only natural kind of sex was that meant for procreation, defending a companionate form of marriage between man and woman, and considered relationships solely undergone for pleasure or affection as unnatural.

Legacy

Neoplatonism
Plotinus criticized both Aristotle's Categories and those of the Stoics. His student Porphyry, however, defended Aristotle's scheme. He justified this by arguing that they be interpreted strictly as expressions, rather than as metaphysical realities. The approach can be justified, at least in part, by Aristotle's own words in The Categories. Boethius' acceptance of Porphyry's interpretation led to their being accepted by Scholastic philosophy.

Christianity
The Fathers of the Church regarded Stoicism as a "pagan philosophy"; nonetheless, early Christian writers employed some of the central philosophical concepts of Stoicism. Examples include the terms "logos", "virtue", "Spirit", and "conscience". But the parallels go well beyond the sharing and borrowing of terminology. Both Stoicism and Christianity assert an inner freedom in the face of the external world, a belief in human kinship with Nature or God, a sense of the innate depravity—or "persistent evil"—of humankind, and the futility and temporary nature of worldly possessions and attachments. Both encourage Ascesis with respect to the passions and inferior emotions, such as lust, and envy, so that the higher possibilities of one's humanity can be awakened and developed. Stoic influence can also be seen in the works of Ambrose of Milan, Marcus Minucius Felix, and Tertullian.

Modern
The modern usage as a "person who represses feelings or endures patiently" The Stanford Encyclopedia of Philosophys entry on Stoicism notes, "the sense of the English adjective 'stoical' is not utterly misleading with regard to its philosophical origins".

The revival of Stoicism in the 20th century can be traced to the publication of Problems In Stoicism by A. A. Long in 1971, and also as part of the late 20th century surge of interest in virtue ethics. Contemporary Stoicism draws from the late 20th and early 21st century spike in publications of scholarly works on ancient Stoicism. Beyond that, the current Stoicist movement traces its roots to the work of Dr. Albert Ellis, who developed rational emotive behavior therapy, as well as Aaron T. Beck, who is regarded by many as the father to early versions of cognitive behavioral therapy (CBT).

Psychology and psychotherapy
Stoic philosophy was the original philosophical inspiration for modern cognitive psychotherapy, particularly as mediated by Dr. Albert Ellis' Rational-Emotive Behaviour Therapy (REBT), the major precursor of CBT.  The original cognitive therapy treatment manual for depression by Aaron T. Beck et al. states, "The philosophical origins of cognitive therapy can be traced back to the Stoic philosophers". A well-known quotation from Enchiridion of Epictetus was taught to most clients during the initial session of traditional REBT by Ellis and his followers: "It's not the events that upset us, but our judgments about the events."

This subsequently became a common element in the socialization phase of many other approaches to CBT. The question of Stoicism's influence on modern psychotherapy, particularly REBT and CBT, was described in detail in The Philosophy of Cognitive–Behavioural Therapy by Donald Robertson.  Several early 20th century psychotherapists were influenced by Stoicism, most notably the "rational persuasion" school founded by the Swiss neurologist and psychotherapist Paul DuBois, who drew heavily on Stoicism in his clinical work and encouraged his clients to study passages from Seneca the Younger as homework assignments.

Similarities of modern Stoicism and Third Wave CBT have been suggested as well, and individual reports of its potency in treating depression have been published. There has also been interest in applying the tenets of ancient Stoicism to the human origin story, environmental education, vegetarianism and the modern challenges of sustainable development, material consumption and consumerism.

Seamus Mac Suibhne has described the practices of spiritual exercises as influencing those of reflective practice. Many parallels between Stoic spiritual exercises and modern cognitive behavioral therapy have been identified. According to philosopher Pierre Hadot, philosophy for a Stoic is not just a set of beliefs or ethical claims; it is a way of life involving constant practice and training (or "askēsis"), an active process of constant practice and self-reminder. Epictetus in his Discourses, distinguished between three types of act: judgment, desire, and inclination. which Hadot identifies these three acts with logic, physics and ethics respectively. Hadot writes that in the Meditations, "Each maxim develops either one of these very characteristic topoi [i.e., acts], or two of them or three of them."

References

Further reading

Primary sources

Andronicus, "On Passions I," Stoicorum Veterum Fragmenta, 3.391. ed. Hans von Arnim. 1903–1905.
Cicero, Marcus Tullius (1945 c. 1927). Cicero : Tusculan Disputations (Loeb Classical Library, No. 141) 2nd Ed. trans. by J. E. King. Cambridge, Massachusetts: Harvard UP.
Long, A. A., Sedley, D. N. (1987). The Hellenistic Philosophers: vol. 1. translations of the principal sources with philosophical commentary. Cambridge, England: Cambridge University Press.
 Inwood, Brad & Gerson Lloyd P. (eds.) The Stoics Reader: Selected Writings and Testimonia Indianapolis: Hackett 2008.
 Long, George Enchiridion by Epictetus, Prometheus Books, Reprint Edition, January 1955.
 Gill C. Epictetus, The Discourses, Everyman 1995.
 Irvine, William, A Guide to the Good Life: The Ancient Art of Stoic Joy (Oxford: Oxford University Press, 2008) 
 Hadas, Moses (ed.), Essential Works of Stoicism, Bantam Books 1961.
 Harvard University Press Epictetus Discourses Books 1 and 2, Loeb Classical Library Nr. 131, June 1925.
 Harvard University Press Epictetus Discourses Books 3 and 4, Loeb Classical Library Nr. 218, June 1928.
 Long, George, Discourses of Epictetus, Kessinger Publishing, January 2004.
 Lucius Annaeus Seneca the Younger (transl. Robin Campbell), Letters from a Stoic: Epistulae Morales Ad Lucilium (1969, reprint 2004) 
Also Available on wikisource translated by various translators
 Oates, Whitney Jennings, The Stoic and Epicurean Philosophers, The Complete Extant Writings of Epicurus, Epictetus, Lucretius and Marcus Aurelius, Random House, 9th printing 1940.

Studies

 Bakalis, Nikolaos, Handbook of Greek Philosophy: From Thales to the Stoics. Analysis and Fragments, Trafford Publishing, 2005, 
 Becker, Lawrence C., A New Stoicism (Princeton: Princeton Univ. Press, 1998) 
 Brennan, Tad, The Stoic Life (Oxford: Oxford University Press, 2005; paperback 2006)
 Brooke, Christopher. Philosophic Pride: Stoicism and Political Thought from Lipsius to Rousseau (Princeton UP, 2012) excerpts

 de Harven, Vanessa (2010). Everything is Something: Why the Stoic ontology is principled, coherent and comprehensive. Paper presented to Department of Philosophy, Berkeley University.
 de Harven, Vanessa (2012). The Coherence of Stoic Ontology. PhD dissertation, Department of Philosophy, Berkeley University.

 Hall, Ron, Secundum Naturam (According to Nature). Stoic Therapy, LLC, 2021.

 Inwood, Brad (ed.), The Cambridge Companion to The Stoics (Cambridge: Cambridge University Press, 2003)
 Lachs, John, Stoic Pragmatism (Indiana University Press, 2012) 
 Long, A. A., Stoic Studies (Cambridge University Press, 1996; repr. University of California Press, 2001) 
 Menn, Stephen (1999). 'The Stoic Theory of Categories', in Oxford Studies in Ancient Philosophy, Volume XVII. Oxford University Press , pp. 215–247.
 Robertson, Donald, The Philosophy of Cognitive-Behavioral Therapy: Stoicism as Rational and Cognitive Psychotherapy (London: Karnac, 2010) 
 Robertson, Donald, How to Think Like a Roman Emperor: The Stoic Philosophy of Marcus Aurelius. 'New York: St. Martin's Press, 2019.
 Sellars, John, Stoicism (Berkeley: University of California Press, 2006) 

 Stephens, William O., Stoic Ethics: Epictetus and Happiness as Freedom (London: Continuum, 2007) 
 Strange, Steven (ed.), Stoicism: Traditions and Transformations (Cambridge: Cambridge Univ. Press, 2004) 
 Zeller, Eduard; Reichel, Oswald J., The Stoics, Epicureans and Sceptics, Longmans, Green, and Co., 1892

External links

 
 
 
 
 
 The Stoic Therapy eLibrary
 The Stoic Library  
 Stoic Logic: The Dialectic from Zeno to Chrysippus
 Annotated Bibliography on Ancient Stoic Dialectic
 
 BBC Radio 4's In Our Time programme on Stoicism (requires Flash)
 The Stoic Registry (formerly New Stoa) :Online Stoic Community
 Modern Stoicism (Stoic Week and Stoicon)
 The Four Stoic Virtues

 
Ancient Greece
Ancient Rome
Schools and traditions in hellenistic philosophy
Virtue
Virtue ethics